"Stop The Music" is a song by New Zealand music producer P-Money featuring fellow rapper Scribe. Written by Scribe, P-Money, Sam "PNC" Hansen and Taina "Tyna" Keelan, it was produced by P-Money. It was released as the lead single from P-Money's second studio album Magic City in late 2004 through Dirty Records with distribution via Festival Mushroom Records under exclusive license for the territories of Australia and New Zealand. The song peaked at number one in New Zealand, and was certified Platinum on 6 December 2004 by the Recording Industry Association of New Zealand. It also reached number seven in Australia, and won 'Best Hip-Hop Single' at the 2006 Australian Urban Music Awards.

Track listing

Personnel
Peter "P-Money" Wadams – main artist, songwriter, producer
Malo "Scribe" Luafutu – featured artist, songwriter
Taina "Tyna" Keelan – guitar, songwriter
Sam "PNC" Hansen – additional vocals, songwriter
Oli Harmer – additional vocals

Charts

Weekly charts

Year-end charts

Certifications

References

2004 songs
2004 singles
P-Money songs
Scribe (rapper) songs
Songs written by P-Money
Number-one singles in New Zealand